The Botswana national rugby union team represents Botswana in the sport of rugby union. Botswana have thus far not played in a Rugby World Cup, but have participated in qualifying tournaments. They are currently ranked 74th in the world.

History
Botswana played their first ever international on September 7, 1996 against Zimbabwe, losing 130 to 10. Their first win came in 2001 in a match against Swaziland, winning 13 points to 3. Also in 2001 they participated in African qualifying tournaments for the 2003 Rugby World Cup in Australia. In 2004 Botswana won four internationals in a row, defeating Tanzania, Swaziland, Nigeria and Mali.

Botswana then participated in the Africa qualifying tournaments for the 2007 Rugby World Cup in France. They were grouped in the Southern Pool of Round 1a, along with nations Zambia and Swaziland. In their first game against Zambia in Lusaka, they lost 28 to 24. However they won their second match 19 to 12 over Swaziland in Botswana. They finished second in the pool and did not advance to the next round.
Julian Harris made History by representing Botswana national rugby union team at the young age of 16 years playing on the wing, as far as possibly known making him the youngest rugby union international in the world

World Cup record
 1987 - 1991 - Did not enter
 1995 - 2019 - Did not qualify

Overall record

See also
 Rugby union in Botswana

References

External links
 Botswana on IRB.com
 Botswana on RugbyData.com
 Botswana Rugby Union

Rugby union in Botswana
African national rugby union teams